Mourgona is a genus of gastropods belonging to the family Hermaeidae. 

The species of this genus are found in Central America, Malesia.

Species:

Mourgona anisti 
Mourgona borgninii 
Mourgona germaineae 
Mourgona murca 
Mourgona osumi

References

 Moro L. & Ortea J. (2015). Nuevos taxones de babosas marinas de las islas Canarias y de Cabo Verde (Mollusca: Heterobranchia). Vieraea. 43: 21-86.

External links
 Er. & Marcus Ev. (1970). Opisthobranchs from Curacao and faunistically related regions. Studies on the Fauna of Curacao and other Caribbean Islands. 33: 1-129

Hermaeidae
Gastropod genera